Funerals and funeral prayers in Islam follow fairly specific rites, though they are subject to regional interpretation and variation in custom. Burial is usually within 24 hours of death to protect the living from any sanitary issues, except in the case of a person killed in battle or when foul play is suspected; in those cases it is important to determine the cause of death before burial. Cremation of the body is strictly forbidden in Islam.

Common Islamic burial rituals 

Burial rituals should normally take place as soon as possible and include:
 Collective bathing of the dead body, except in extraordinary circumstances, as in the battle of Uhud.
 Enshrouding the dead body in a white cotton or linen cloth.
 Funeral prayer.
 Burial of the dead body in a grave.
 Positioning the deceased so that the head is faced towards Mecca.

Bathing the body

The corpse is washed (bathed), with the purpose to physically cleanse the deceased. The exact manner, method, style and accessories used for bathing the corpse may vary by locale and temporal position, except that it is to be done with heated water. Bathing the dead body is an essential ritual of the Sunnah of the Islamic prophet Muhammad, and therefore a part of the Islamic sharia. This should occur as soon as possible after death, preferably within hours.

Orthodox practice is to wash the body an odd number of times (at least once) with a cloth covering its  (parts of the body that should be hidden according to sharia).

The "washers" are commonly adult members of the immediate family, who are of the same gender as the deceased. In cases of violent deaths or accidents, where the deceased has suffered trauma or mutilation, morgue facilities mend the body and wrap it in a shroud to minimise fluid leakage prior to surrendering it to mourners for washing.

Shrouding
The corpse is typically wrapped in a simple plain cloth (the ). This is done to respect the dignity and privacy of the deceased with the family sometimes present. The specifics of this ritual, including the material, style, and colour of the cloth, may vary between regions. However, the shroud should be simple and modest. It is for this reason that Muslims have generally preferred to use white cotton cloth to serve as the shroud. Men may use only three pieces of cloth and women five pieces of cloth.

The body may be kept in this state for several hours, allowing well-wishers to pass on their respects and condolences.

Funeral prayer
After the announcement of death of the deceased person, the Muslims of the community gather to offer their collective prayers for the forgiveness of the dead.

The Janazah prayer is as follows:
 Supplication for the deceased and mankind is recited.
 In extraordinary circumstances, the prayer can be postponed and prayed at a later time as was done in the Battle of Uhud.

Burial

Following washing, shrouding and prayer, the body is then taken for burial. The exact manner, customs and  style of the grave, the burial and so forth may vary by regional custom.

The grave should be perpendicular to the direction of the Qibla (i.e. Mecca) so that the body, placed in the grave without a coffin lying on its right side, faces the Qibla. Grave markers are simple, because outwardly lavish displays are discouraged in Islam. Graves are frequently marked only with a simple wreath, if at all. However, it is becoming more common for family members to erect grave monuments.

In Middle Eastern Muslim cultures, women are generally discouraged from participating in the funeral procession. The reason for this is that in pre-Islamic Arabia it was customary for grieving women to wail loudly. Wealthy families often even hired moirologists to attend the funerals of their deceased relative. Wailing at funerals is not permitted according to the Sahih Bukhari. Women are allowed to attend or be present if they do not wail or cry or hit themselves in grief, especially in an exaggerated excessive manner as in pre-Islamic Arabia.

Three fist-sized spheres of hand-packed soil prepared beforehand by the gravediggers are used to prop up the corpse, one under the head, one under the chin and one under the shoulder. The lowering of the corpse and positioning of the soil-balls is done by the next of kin. In the case of a deceased husband, a male brother or brother-in-law usually performs this task. In the case of a deceased wife, the husband undertakes this if physically able to. If the husband is elderly, then the eldest son (or son-in-law) is responsible for lowering, alignment and propping the deceased.

Orthodoxy expects those present to symbolically pour three handfuls of soil into the grave while reciting a Quranic verse meaning, "We created you from it, and return you into it, and from it we will raise you a second time". More prayers are then said, asking for forgiveness of the deceased, and reminding the dead of their profession of faith.

The corpse is then fully buried by the gravediggers, who may stamp or pat down the earth to shape. Commonly, the eldest male will supervise. After the burial, those gathered pay their last respects to the dead by collectively praying for the forgiveness of the dead. This collective prayer is the last formal one for the dead. In some cultures such as those in Southeast Asia, relatives scatter flowers and pour rosewater upon the grave before leaving.

Mourning
According to Sunni Islam, loved ones and relatives are to observe a three-day mourning period. Islamic mourning is observed by increased devotion, receiving visitors and condolences, and avoiding decorative clothing and jewelry in accordance with the Qur'an. Widows observe an extended mourning period ("period of waiting"), four months and 10 days long. During that time, the widow is not to remarry or to interact with non- (a man she can marry). This rule is to confirm that the woman is not pregnant with the deceased's child prior to remarrying. However, in case of emergencies such as visiting a doctor because of a health emergency, the widow can interact with non-.

Grief at the death of a loved one and weeping for the dead is normal and acceptable.

Pre-Islamic practices of wailing were instrumental in illustrating the role that women played in Islam. The act of lamentation came to represent Jahiliya behavior, or contrary to ideal Islamic behavior according to the Prophet Muhammad. Loud grieving was inappropriate and was a viewed as questioning God. Women were portrayed as emotional and unable to control themselves when grieving. However, later Muhammad lost his son, and established the difference between grieving and crying. Outward and loud grief was inappropriate, whereas crying was appropriate.

Sunni Islam expects expressions of  grief to remain dignified, prohibiting loud wailing or mourning in a loud voice, shrieking, beating the chest and cheeks, tearing hair or clothes, breaking objects, scratching faces or speaking  (such as challenging the power of God e.g. "If God exists and is just, he would not allow such injustice”). Grieving is allowed as part of the funerary rites to allow one to come to terms with the loss of a person passing away as long as it respects Allah.

Directives for widows
The Qur'an prohibits widows to engage themselves for four lunar months and ten days, after the death of their husbands. According to the Qur'an:

Islamic scholars consider this directive a balance between the mourning of a husband's death and the protection of a widow from cultural or societal censure if she became interested in remarrying after her husband's death, often an economic necessity. This provision also operates to protect the property rights of the unborn, as the duration is enough to ascertain whether a widow is pregnant or not.

Husbands are recommended to make a will in favor of their wives for the provision of one year's residence and maintenance, except if the wives themselves leave the house or take any other similar step. As stated in Qur'an:

See also
 Islamic view of death
 Burial at sea in Islam
 The Majmuna Stone, a 12th-century Islamic marble tombstone
 Wadi-us-Salaam, an Islamic cemetery and the largest cemetery in the world

References

Bibliography
 
 Amin Ahsan Islahi, Tadabbur-i-Qur'an, 2nd ed., vol. 1, (Lahore: Faran Foundation, 1986)

External links

 Funeral Wise: Islamic Funeral Customs and Service Rituals
 Cases where exhumation are allowed, according to Ja'fari fiqh: Exhuming the body of my dead sister
 Islam Death Rituals 

Funerals
Islamic jurisprudence
Islam and death
Sharia